"Wand of Abaris" is title of single of Swedish symphonic metal band Therion from Gothic Kabbalah studio album released in 2007.

The song's title is a reference to the legend of Abaris the Hyperborean.

Track listing
 "The Wand of Abaris" (Christofer Johnsson, Kristian Niemann, Thomas Karlsson) – 5:52
 "Path to Arcady" (K. Niemann, Petter Karlsson) – 3:55
 "TOF – The Trinity" (K. Niemann, Mats Levén, P. Karlsson) – 6:18

Personnel
See: Gothic Kabbalah credits.

2006 singles
Therion (band) songs
2007 songs
Songs with lyrics by Thomas Karlsson